The 2006 European Road Championships were held in Valkenburg and Heerlen, Netherlands, between 13 July and 16 July 2006. Regulated by the European Cycling Union. The event consisted of a road race and a time trial for men and women under 23 and juniors.

Schedule

Individual time trial 
Thursday 13 July 2006
 Women U23, 24.0 km
 Men Juniors, 24.0 km

Friday 14 July 2006
 Women U23, 34.0 km
 Men Juniors, 16.1 km

Road race
Saturday 15 July 2006
 Women U23, 110.0 km
 Men Juniors, 144.0 km

Sunday 16 July 2006
 Women Juniors, 77.7 km
 Men U23, 177.6 km

Events summary

Countries
  Netherlands at the 2006 European Road Championships
incomplete list

Medal table

References

External links
The European Cycling Union

 
International cycle races hosted by the Netherlands
European Road Championships, 2006
Road cycling
European Road Championships by year